The Mag-aba National High School (Mataas na Paaralang Nasyonal ng Mag-aba) (formerly Mag-aba Barangay High School) is a public national secondary high school located in Mag-aba, Pandan, Antique, Philippines.

History
Mag-aba National High School, formerly Mag-aba Barangay High School, was established as a result of efforts by the local community under the leadership of Dr. Cashmere Dy Buco Ambay. The school was initially situated within the existing Mag-aba Elementary School campus and the classrooms made with nipa and wooden materials were first built and the first class was held on June 17, 1977.

An increased demand for secondary education in the 1980s led to a notable increase in the student population as residents of nearby communities began enrolling in the school. In 1992, the school was moved to a location in the eastern section of Mag-aba through the purchase and donation by Rev. & Mrs. Paulino A. Blanza of land previously owned by the Estores family.

The People Power Revolution in 1986 saw the rise to power of former Philippine President Corazon Aquino, which led to the nationalization of many Barangay High Schools in the province. The school was subsequently renamed the Mag-aba National High School. The buildings and structures on the campus were constructed with government assistance.

It is one of the 7 secondary schools in the municipality of Pandan, Antique and one of the prominent institutions in the municipality in terms of academic performance and extra-curricular engagement. Due to the geographic location, the hill side and the higher portions were graded to build classrooms. The school campus covers 1,469 hectares, half of which is hilly. It is seven (7) km from Pandan's town center.

School year
MNHS opens its classes every the first Monday of June. The Department of Education manages all school activities, school holidays and other important events.

Achievements and recognition 
The MNHS competes with other schools in the municipality as well as schools throughout the province of Antique. The school also sends its students to regional competitions such as the Regional Secondary Schools Press Conference in the field of Campus Journalism and the Western Visayas Regional Athletics Meet. In April, 2012, the school received the "Model School Award for Small School Category", given by the Division of Antique. In the same year, school head Mrs. Rosalyn Estores was awarded "Committed Principal, Small School Category". Currently the school is under the K-12 Curriculum and began facing series of changes for the said curriculum. In 2016, it began its first phase of establishing its first Senior High School Program (SHS) which included vocational and academic tracks for Grade 11 and Grade 12.

In April 2014, the school was qualified to participate in the National Schools Press Conference-the most prestigious journalism competition in the Philippines held in Subic, Zambales.

Organizations
 Freshmen Class Organization
 Sophomore Class Organization
 Junior Class Organization
 Senior Class Organization
 Tribu Kapagangan (MNHS Performing Arts Society)
 Samahan ng Makabayang Kabataan (SAMAKA)
 Mathematics Club
 Civil Technology Club
 Culinary Arts Club
 Student Crime Prevention Committee
 Communication Arts Club
 Citizenship Advancement Training-I
 Kapagangan - The Official School Community Publication of the Mag-aba National High School
 Boy Scouts of the Philippines
 Girl Scouts of the Philippines
 Samahan ng mga Mag-aaral sa Filipino (SAMAGFIL)
 Home Economics Club
 Drafting Club
 ICT Society
 Youth for Environment and School Organization (Yes-O)
 The Mag-aba National High School Supreme Student Government

References

External links
School website

High schools in the Philippines
Schools in Antique (province)